Adnan Džafić (born 10 May 1990) is a Bosnian professional footballer who plays as a midfielder for Bosnian Premier League club Sarajevo.

Career
In 2010, Džafić almost signed with Dinamo Zagreb, Croatia's most successful club, from First League of FBiH side Bosna Visoko, Bosnia and Herzegovina's second division. After that, he joined Czech second division side Čáslav, where he made 54 league appearances and scored 7 goals. On 7 April 2010, Džafić made his league debut for Čáslav during a 1–2 loss to Vlašim. On 7 April 2010, he scored his first goal for Čáslav during a 1–2 loss to Vlašim.

In 2017, Džafić signed with Fastav Zlín in the Czech top flight. In July 2020, he joined Bosnian Premier League club Tuzla City.

Honours
Fastav Zlín
Czechoslovak Supercup: 2017
Kristalnih 11: 2022

References

External links

1990 births
Living people
People from Visoko
Bosnia and Herzegovina footballers
Association football midfielders
Expatriate footballers in the Czech Republic
Czech First League players
Bosnia and Herzegovina expatriate sportspeople in the Czech Republic
Czech National Football League players
Premier League of Bosnia and Herzegovina players
FK Tuzla City players
FC Fastav Zlín players
FK Mladá Boleslav players
FC Silon Táborsko players
FK Čáslav players
FK Sarajevo players
Bosnia and Herzegovina expatriate footballers